Morteratsch railway station is a railway station in the municipality of Pontresina, in the Swiss canton of Graubünden. It is located on the Bernina line of the Rhaetian Railway.

The station has a single through track and a single platform with a station building. There is a siding in the station, and a passing loop just outside the station in the northbound direction. In the southbound direction the line passes over the Ova da Morteratsch on a railway bridge immediately after the station platform, and then over the Ova da Bernina on a viaduct some  later.

The Hotel-Restaurant Morteratsch, which adjoins the station to the north, predates the railway. When it was built it was very close to the tongue of the glacier, which has since receded due to global warming, and benefited from significant tourist traffic. As a result, the line from Pontresina was opened in 1908, and the station was the terminus of the line until the section over the Bernina pass was opened in 1910. Even then it was originally intended as the winter terminus of the line, with the line over the pass operating only during the summer months, a situation that continued until it was decided to open the line throughout starting with the winter of 1913/4.

Services
The following services stop at Morteratsch:

References

External links
 
 

Railway stations in Graubünden
Rhaetian Railway stations
Railway stations in Switzerland opened in 1908